Karrehkan (also Romanized as Karrehkān; also known as Karkān, Korkān, Korkān, and Korrekān) is a village in Bakesh-e Yek Rural District, in the Central District of Mamasani County, Fars Province, Iran. At the 2006 census, its population was 127, in 28 families.

References 

Populated places in Mamasani County